Paralympic shooting has been competed at the Summer Paralympic Games since 1976. Events include men's, women's, and mixed events using rifles and pistols.

Summary

Medal summary
Overall results from both rifle and pistol shooting events in all categories (men's, women's and mixed). Updated to the 2020 Summer Paralympics.

Nations

See also
Shooting at the Summer Olympics

External links
Shooting at the London 2012 Paralympic Games
Shooting Rulebook – International Shooting Sport Federation (ISSF)

 
Shooting
Paralympic Games